TG-4 may refer to:

 Schweizer SGS 2-33, a glider used by the United States Air Force Academy, by 1962 United States Tri-Service aircraft designation
 Laister-Kauffman TG-4, a glider used by the United States Army Air Force in World War II
 Naval Aircraft Factory TG-4, a  United States Navy seaplane prototype
 Olympus Tough TG-4, a weatherised digital compact camera by Olympus Corporation

See also
 TG4, a public service broadcaster for Irish language speakers in Ireland and Northern Ireland